Mudhal Kural is a 1992 Indian Tamil language drama film,  directed by  V. C. Guhunathan and produced by Nellai Anandan and Varadanandan. The film stars Sivaji Ganesan, Arjun Sarja and Kanaka.

Plot 
  
Veluthambi, a popular rebel in Puliyampatti constituency, is seen by the ruling party as a threat to their senior leader and minister Mohanamba aka Mohana who is set to contest the upcoming election from the seat. Mohana's effort to tempt him out of her way is unsuccessful. Mohana's relative "Salpatta" Vasu, a wealthy businessman, sends henchmen to kill Veluthambi and his comrades. Veluthambi fights off the henchmen even as his comrades are burnt in a hut. However, the local police inspector (accompanying the henchmen) shoots him to death. The police tries to silence the resultant uproar among the people. But things get complicated as Jeeva, a senior journalist from Dina Madal comes in and tries to gather the truth for publication. Mohana unsuccessfully tries to silence Jeeva. Later, the editor of Dina Madal dismisses Jeeva, who then finds job in another newspaper. He writes about Veluthambi's murder in the editorial. This time, henchmen enter his house and break things as a warning. Later, another group of henchmen try to harm Jeeva. His son Kumaran interferes and fights them off.

Kumaran, who is a third year B.A. English Literature student, is in love with Vaani, Vasu's daughter. But after learning that it was Vasu who set men to harm his father, he shuns Vaani. The latter visits Kumaran's house, pretending to seek Jeeva's guidance for learning journalism. Amused at her true motive, Jeeva accepts her as an assistant but leaves his son to decide over her love proposal. Kumaran sends away Vaani, saying that if something happens to his father on account of their love, the society will be at loss. Jeeva meets Vasu to seek his consent for the relationship. Vasu insults Jeeva, and plans to arrange a groom for Vaani at the earliest. He then orders his men to lock her away. But Kumaran stealthily picks her up and marries her in a function held at a temple.

Later, Jeeva is dismissed from the present newspaper too, which distances itself from his news regarding Mohana's role in the killing of Veluthambi.  Jeeva learns that Vasu has purchased the entire agency. He vows to unmask Vasu, Mohana and the newspaper in front of all.

In a parallel plot, Rekha develops an interest in Karan, her fellow tenant. While on a journey to meet her mother, her bus is interrupted by some men who abduct her and keeps her in a remote place. Vasu is shown to be behind this incident. He tries to violate Rekha but she escapes. As she is fleeing Vasu's men, she comes across Karan. As one of the henchmen nears her, she inches away and falls to her death off a cliff, despite Karan's effort to save her.

Later, Jeeva sues Mohana for Veluthambi's murder and the court takes up the case. Hoping to finish off Jeeva, Vasu arranges for a bomb to be secretly planted in his car. It is supposed to explode during Jeeva's journey to the court. After he departs with his lawyer, his wife discovers that he has forgotten to take the audiotape evidence (against Mohana). She asks Kumaran to follow the car and give it to his father. Kumaran leaves with Karan and catches up with the car. He gives the tape to his father and tries to maneuver the car with Karan's help. As he test-drives the car alone, the bomb explodes, killing Kumaran. The devastated Jeeva lets Vaani keep Kumaran's ashes instead of dissolving it in water (as per customs).

The police claims that Kumaran's death was accidental. Karan vows to expose the murderers. He captures two of the perpetrators and brings them before Jeeva, asking him to write about them and reveal the truth to all. Jeeva expresses his frustration with the entire system. Through his impassioned speech, Karan tries to infuse him with new courage but in vain. Later, Vasu's henchmen attack Karan's companions. They are afraid of the safety of their families and prepare to leave Karan. He becomes furious and reinvigorates them through his passionate speech. He then joins hands with Jeeva and start a daily newspaper called Mudhal Kural, through which they continue to voice against the establishment.

As Vaani and Karan go out together, Vasu spots them. He becomes angry and confronts Jeeva, accusing him of misleading Vaani. Both Vaani and Jeeva could shoulder him. Jeeva tries to bring Vaani in marriage with Karan. But Vaani appears in traditional widow's garb before Jeeva, his wife, and Karan's younger paternal uncle and aunt as they discuss the marriage. She fears that her ties with Jeeva and his wife will be severed if she remarries. Th couple accept her decision with grief.

Later, Vaani and Karan secretly reach Vasu's residence and videotape his incriminating conversation with Mohana and an agent connected with their ship scam. Karan's companion Vinoth asks them to submit the tape to Jeeva, and leaves, taking the camera alone. He then turns up at Jeeva's office with bullet wounds, saying that he offered to get trapped at Vasu's residence, while Vaani and Karan have escaped into the forest for safety. He requests Jeeva to save them at any cost. Jeeva takes the issue to the inspector, who asks him to meet Mohana. Jeeva meets her and offers to destroy the evidences against her in return for Vaani's and Karan's lives. Mohana taunts him and asks him to meet her with a petition. Jeeva gives her a stern warning. Mohana asks two constables to assault him. Jeeva is also beaten up by some henchmen.

Vaani and Karan are captured by another group of henchmen, who torture them in an attempt to know the location of the tape. Meanwhile, the hospitalized Jeeva is devastated to hear news of his office being set on fire and the death of his wife at the hands of the henchmen. He finds the inspector and shoot him to death. In the forest, Vaani frees herself and tries to rescue Karan from the seesaw (with which the henchmen earlier waterboarded Karan) . The henchmen attack the two. While Karan fights them, Vaani falls into the water. Karan rescues her and asks her to reach the court with the tape. Jeeva calls Dina Madal from a telephone booth  and tells the sub-editor that as he is in a challenge with Mohana, he must remain undercover. This statement is published in the paper.

Mohana's partymen invite her for a wedding. Though initially fearing danger from Jeeva, she agrees to participate with heavy security. Meanwhile, Vasu - unaware of Vaani's and Karan's escape - asks one of his men to kill them, as they firmly refused to reveal the tape's location.

Mohana arrives at the wedding with security cover. As she ascends the dais, policemen entrusted with her security notice a suspicious man in the garb of a godman. As they approach him, he leaves the place. He then assaults a server and assumes his role. As Mohana leaves after the wedding feast, Jeeva appears before her and shoots her. Briefly after, he too is shot by the chief security officer amidst chaos in the wedding hall. Despite his injury, he sees Mohana escaping through a glass exit. He throws an axe-like tool towards that door. This shatters the glass which falls on Mohana, killing her. Jeeva is later produced in court. The judge asks him if he has killed the inspector and Mohana. Jeeva asks the judge if Krishna, Vanchinathan and Bhagat Singh can be considered as murderers.

At the same time, Karan finds Vasu and strangles him. The film ends with him going to jail.

Cast
Sivaji Ganesan as Jeeva
Arjun Sarja as Karan
Kanaka as Vaani
Vijayakumar as Veluthambi
Anand as Kumaran
Manjula as Mohanamba
Jayabharathi
Sreeja as Rekha
Jai Ganesh as "Salpatta" Vasu
Chinni Jayanth as Vinoth
Charle
Thennavan
M. S. Bhaskar

Production

Development

Writing 
To write dialogues for the film, Guhanathan approached Suba Veerapandian aka Subavee (his colleague in pro-Eelam activism; younger brother of director S. P. Muthuraman whom Guhanathan introduced into Kollywood as director).

Subavee accepted the offer after some initial reluctance. He paired with his colleague Peer Muhamad and in about two weeks, wrote dialogues for about 60 scenes.  At a point, Subavee and Guhanathan differed over the portrayal of the female lead after she becomes a widow. Being a rationalist, Subavee argued that the heroine has revolutionary ideals and therefore need not be portrayed in a white saree (attire of a traditional Hindu widow). Guhanathan maintained "There are some sentiments pertaining to cinema. Women [in the audience] will not accept if we do as you say". As it was Guhanathan who was in charge of the production, Subavee chose not to stress on his opinion. However, in the film, Jeeva can be seen questioning the relevance of the widowhood rituals.

This was the point at which Subavee and Guhanathan decided to end their film partnership and collaborate only in pro-Eelam activities. Subavee also insisted on not being named in the film credits, as only 10 of the 60 scenes he wrote made their way into the final script.

Casting 
After watching Kanaka's performance in Karakattakkaran (1989), Guhanathan and Subavee selected her to play the female lead Vaani.

Filming

Post-production

Music

Soundtrack
The soundtrack was composed by Chandrabose and  lyrics by Pulamaipithan.

Release

Reception

References

1992 films
Indian action drama films
1990s Tamil-language films
1990s action drama films
Films directed by V. C. Guhanathan
1992 drama films
Films scored by Chandrabose (composer)